Prorocentrum donghaiense is a species of bloom-forming species of planktonic dinoflagellates.

References

Further reading

External links

Protists described in 2001
Dinophyceae
Dinoflagellate species